The Gsieser Bach is a stream in South Tyrol, Italy. It flows into the Rienz in Welsberg.

References 
 Information about the Gsieser Bach in German and Italian.

External links 

Rivers of Italy
Rivers of South Tyrol